Teaafua a Taepoa or Teaafua-a-Taepoa, is an islet of Nanumea atoll, Tuvalu. It is a small uninhabited islet, which Nanumean traditions describe as being formed when sand spilled from the baskets of two women, Pai and Vau, when they were forced off Nanumea by Tefolaha, the Tongan warrior who became the ancestor of the people of Nanumea.

See also

 Desert island
 List of islands

References

Uninhabited islands of Tuvalu
Nanumea